Deportivo Champerico is a Guatemalan football club from Champerico, Retalhuleu Department. It currently plays on Segunda División de Ascenso, third tier on Guatemalan football.

References 
http://fedefutguate.org

Football clubs in Guatemala